Louisiana Highway 4 (LA 4) is a state highway located in northern Louisiana.  It runs  in an east–west direction from U.S. Highway 71 (US 71) at Loggy Bayou to LA 605 in Newellton.

Along the way, it serves the city of Winnsboro and smaller towns such as Ringgold, Jonesboro, Chatham, Columbia, and Newellton (its eastern terminus). It also intersects many of the state's major north–south routes, such as US 71 (its western terminus), US 371, US 167, US 165, US 425, and US 65.

Though it runs primarily east–west, LA 4 meanders along rural roads for virtually its entire distance, bending considerably to the north and south in order to pass through the centers of various towns. LA 4 travels through five parishes, connecting the parish seats of the middle three (Jackson, Caldwell, and Franklin). Its eastern terminus, however, comes within  of the Mississippi state line at the Mississippi River.

Route description

Western terminus to Jonesboro
From the west, LA 4 begins at an intersection with US 71 at the extreme southwest corner of Bienville Parish. It proceeds east as an undivided two-lane highway and runs along the Red River Parish line for  before curving to the northeast toward Ringgold. After , it intersects LA 790, which heads southeast to US 371 at Tullis.   later, LA 4 enters Ringgold on Mill Street where it intersects LA 154 (School Street). The two highways proceed in a concurrency to the town's main junction at US 371 (Military Road), which connects to Minden on the north and Coushatta on the south. After making a brief jog south onto US 371, LA 4 and LA 154 turn east onto Bienville Road. Here it intersects LA 792, which also connects to Jamestown, and briefly turns southeast, continuing the route of that highway to the village's main junction. At a four-way intersection, LA 153 continues the route southeast to Ashland; LA 507 proceeds southwest toward Womack; and LA 4 turns northeast co-signed with LA 507 for one block until the latter turns north onto Kepler Road.

Leaving Castor, LA 4 proceeds in a general eastern direction for  where it intersects LA 9 in an area known as Lucky.  The immediate destinations of LA 9 are Bienville to the north and Saline to the south.   later, LA 4 intersects LA 155, also connecting to LA 9 at Saline, and the two highways proceed in a concurrency to a point known as Friendship.  Here, LA 501 heads south toward Calvin, and shortly thereafter, LA 155 splits off to the north toward Liberty Hill.  Meanwhile, LA 4 curves to the southeast through Danville, a point on the Kansas City Southern Railway (KCS), and crosses the Dugdemona River into Jackson Parish  later.

Jonesboro to Winnsboro
 inside the parish line, LA 4 enters Jonesboro, the parish seat, and widens to an undivided four-lane highway. It then turns east from South Cooper Street onto East Main Street, a divided two-lane street, and passes through the center of town. After crossing the KCS tracks, LA 4 intersects the concurrent US 167 and LA 147. US 167 connects to Ruston on the north and Winnfield on the south. Running through town on Shell Avenue, it intersects LA 146, another route into Ruston, and curves to the southeast. It then intersects LA 34, which heads to Winnfield on the south and the major city of Monroe to the northeast.

After crossing the parish line, LA 4 curves to the southeast and intersects LA 557 at a point known as Vixen.   later, LA 4 intersects LA 846 at Mount Pleasant. After a brief concurrency, LA 846 splits off to the north, running parallel to LA 4 toward the previous junction with LA 557.   later, LA 4 intersects LA 3239, a gravel road that connects to LA 126 west of Grayson. After another , LA 4 intersects LA 850 at Pulpwood Spur then curves to the northeast across the Union Pacific Railroad (UP) tracks to US 165 at Banks Springs, just north of Grayson. LA 4 turns northeast to follow US 165, becoming an undivided four-lane highway (with middle turning lane) into Columbia, the parish seat, intersecting LA 849 on the way. In Columbia, US 165 and LA 4 cross a high-level bridge over the Ouachita River, after which LA 4 resumes its eastward course as an undivided two-lane highway while US 165 continues north toward Monroe. LA 4 then turns back to the east while LA 559 continues south along the river.   later, LA 4 crosses the Boeuf River into Franklin Parish after passing through the Boeuf Wildlife Management Area.

Shortly afterward, LA 562 heads south and loops to the east across Turkey Creek Lake to Wisner, and finally, LA 128 heads east to Gilbert on US 425/LA 15. At this last junction, LA 4 curves to the northeast toward Winnsboro. After , LA 4 intersects LA 865 at a point known as Brownell, followed  later by LA 3201 (Riser Road), a connector to US 425/LA 15 on the south edge of Winnsboro.

Winnsboro to Newellton
LA 4 enters Winnsboro, which serves as the parish seat, and runs along Prairie Road.  LA 4 then reaches the main thoroughfare, Front Street, an undivided four-lane roadway (with middle turning lane) and part of the concurrent US 425 and LA 15.  LA 4 turns northwest onto Front Street, adding to the concurrency for a few blocks, to a four-way intersection where US 425 and LA 15 continue north toward Bastrop and Monroe, respectively; LA 130 heads west along Taylor Avenue; and LA 4 takes a sharp turn east onto Kinloch Street, becoming an undivided two-lane highway once again.  This intersection also marks the western terminus of LA 17, which follows LA 4 east out of Winnsboro.  Before exiting the city, LA 4 and LA 17 intersect the northern segment of LA 865 (Pine Street) and LA 864 (Loop Road), another connector to US 425/LA 15.  Shortly after crossing the city limits, LA 17 splits off to the north toward Crowville.

After , LA 4 intersects LA 863, which connects to LA 578 a short distance away.  LA 4 turns to the southeast and intersects LA 578 itself, continuing the route of that highway south to a point known as Como, where it intersects and begins a concurrency with LA 128 northeast of Gilbert.  Briefly following along a bend in Bayou Macon, LA 4 and LA 128 intersect LA 555, which travels northward along the bayou.  Just east of the bayou is an intersection with LA 572 at Lorelein.   east of this intersection, LA 4 and LA 128 cross the Tensas River into Tensas Parish.

 inside the parish line, LA 128 splits to the southeast toward St. Joseph.  LA 4 proceeds eastward along the Tensas River for a short distance to LA 888 then continues for another  to LA 575.  Shortly afterward, LA 4 enters the town of Newellton, its final destination, and intersects US 65, which heads north to Tallulah and south to Ferriday.  LA 4 follows Verona Street in Newellton and reaches its eastern terminus at LA 605 (Main Street), which runs along Lake St. Joseph, an ox-bow lake of the Mississippi River.

History
In the original Louisiana Highway system in use between 1921 and 1955, the modern LA 4 made of parts of several routes, including: State Route 13 from the western terminus at US 71 to Ringgold; State Route 417 to Castor; State Route C-2203 to Friendship; State Route 13 again to Chatham; LA 17 to Winnsboro; State Route 16 east out of Winnsboro; State Route 48 to the modern junction with LA 128 east of the Tensas River; and State Route 76 to the eastern terminus in Newellton.

LA 4 was created with the 1955 Louisiana Highway renumbering, and its route has remained the same apart from a shift onto a new bridge at Columbia in Caldwell Parish.

In Columbia, LA 4 and US 165 originally curved slightly to the northeast at Church Street and crossed a vertical lift bridge over the Ouachita River.  It then rejoined the location of the current alignment just south of the intersection where LA 4 turns eastward, separating from US 165.  This bridge, built in 1935, was replaced by the current four-lane high-level span in 2007.  This construction was part of a larger project to widen US 165 to four lanes throughout the state of Louisiana, completed in 2012.  The original bridge has been demolished, but the approaches still exist as local roads.

Major intersections

See also

References

External links

Maps / GIS Data Homepage, Louisiana Department of Transportation and Development

0004
Transportation in Red River Parish, Louisiana
Transportation in Bienville Parish, Louisiana
Transportation in Jackson Parish, Louisiana
Transportation in Caldwell Parish, Louisiana
Transportation in Franklin Parish, Louisiana
Transportation in Tensas Parish, Louisiana